Jakub Ziobrowski (born 23 January 1997) is a Polish professional volleyball player with American citizenship. At the professional club level, he plays for Alanya Belediyespor in Turkey.

Career

Clubs
In May 2016 he signed a three–year contract with the first senior team in his career – Cerrad Czarni Radom.

National team
On April 12, 2015 Poland men's national under-19 volleyball team, including Ziobrowski, won title of U19 European Champion 2015. They beat Italy U19 in the final (3–1). He took part in European Youth Olympic Festival with Polish national U19 team. On August 1, 2015 he achieved gold medal (final match with Bulgaria 3–0). On August 23, 2015 Poland achieved first title of U19 World Champion. In the final his team beat hosts – Argentina (3–2). On September 10, 2016 he achieved title of the 2016 U20 European Champion after winning 7 of 7 matches in tournament and beating Ukraine U21 in the final (3–1). Also, Ziobrowski received individual award for the Best Opposite Spiker. On July 2, 2017 Poland U21, including Ziobrowski, achieved title of U21 World Champion 2017 after beating Cuba U21 in the final (3–0). His national team won 47 matches in the row and never lost. The U21 World Champion title ended up his time in youth national teams.

Honours

Youth national team
 2015  CEV U19 European Championship
 2015  European Youth Olympic Festival
 2015  FIVB U19 World Championship
 2016  CEV U20 European Championship
 2017  FIVB U21 World Championship

Individual awards
 2016: CEV U20 European Championship – Best Opposite

References

External links
 
 Player profile at PlusLiga.pl 
 Player profile at Volleybox.net

1997 births
Living people
Sportspeople from New York City
Polish men's volleyball players
Polish expatriate sportspeople in Turkey
Expatriate volleyball players in Turkey
Czarni Radom players
Cuprum Lubin players
Projekt Warsaw players
LKPS Lublin players
Ślepsk Suwałki players
Opposite hitters